Gorgyra is an Afrotropical genus of grass skippers in the family Hesperiidae. Larvae feed mainly on Connaraceae, including Rourea. Other recorded larval food plants include Drypetes and Macadamia. Their habitat is generally lowland tropical rain forest and savanna.

Species
Gorgyra aburae  (Plötz, 1879)
Gorgyra afikpo  Druce, 1909
Gorgyra aretina  (Hewitson, 1878)
Gorgyra bibulus  Riley, 1929
Gorgyra bina  Evans, 1937
Gorgyra bule  Miller, 1964
Gorgyra diva  Evans, 1937
Gorgyra diversata  Evans, 1937
Gorgyra heterochrus  (Mabille, 1890)
Gorgyra johnstoni  (Butler, 1894)
Gorgyra kalinzu  Evans, 1949
Gorgyra minima  Holland, 1896
Gorgyra mocquerysii  Holland, 1896
Gorgyra pali  Evans, 1937
Gorgyra rubescens  Holland, 1896
Gorgyra sara  Evans, 1937
Gorgyra sola  Evans, 1937
Gorgyra subfacatus  (Mabille, 1890)
Gorgyra subflavidus  Holland, 1896
Gorgyra vosseleri  Grünberg, 1907
Gorgyra warreni Collins & Larsen, 2008

References

Seitz, A. Die Gross-Schmetterlinge der Erde 13: Die Afrikanischen Tagfalter. Plate XIII 77

Erionotini